Cerebral vasculitis (sometimes the word angiitis is used instead of "vasculitis") is vasculitis (inflammation of the blood vessel wall) involving the brain and occasionally the spinal cord. It affects all of the vessels: very small blood vessels (capillaries), medium-size blood vessels (arterioles and venules), or large blood vessels (arteries and veins). If blood flow in a vessel with vasculitis is reduced or stopped, the parts of the body that receive blood from that vessel begins to die. It may produce a wide range of neurological symptoms, such as headache, skin rashes, feeling very tired, joint pains, difficulty moving or coordinating part of the body, changes in sensation, and alterations in perception, thought or behavior, as well as the phenomena of a mass lesion in the brain leading to coma and herniation. Some of its signs and symptoms may resemble multiple sclerosis. 10% have associated bleeding in the brain.

Causes
"Primary" angiitis/vasculitis of the central nervous system (PACNS) is said to be present if there is no underlying cause. The exact mechanism of the primary disease is unknown, but the fundamental mechanism of all vasculitides is autoimmunity. Other possible secondary causes of cerebral vasculitis are infections, systemic auto-immune diseases such as systemic lupus erythematosus (SLE) and rheumatoid arthritis, medications and drugs (amphetamine, cocaine and heroin), some forms of cancer (lymphomas, leukemia and lung cancer) and other forms of systemic vasculitis such as granulomatosis with polyangiitis, polyarteritis nodosa or Behçet's disease. It may imitate, and is in turn imitated by, a number of other diseases that affect the blood vessels of the brain diffusely such as fibromuscular dysplasia and thrombotic thrombocytopenic purpura.

Diagnosis
Cerebral angiography and magnetic resonance imaging, family medical history, symptoms, a complete physical examination, and ultimately biopsy of the brain, are often required for the diagnosis. Also, many lab tests must be done for the diagnosis; tests may reveal anemia (a shortage of red blood cells), a high white blood cell count, a high platelet count, allergic reactions, immune complexes, antibodies (tools the body uses to fight off threats) and elevation of inflammatory markers. Another crucial part in the diagnosis of cerebral vasculitis is the use of imaging techniques. Techniques such as conventional digital subtraction angiography (DSA) and magnetic resonance imaging (MRI) are used to find and monitor cerebral involvement.

Treatment
Treatment is first with many different high-dose steroids, namely glucocorticoids. Then, if symptoms do not improve additional immunosuppression such as cyclophosphamide are added to decrease the immune system's attack on the body's own tissues. Cerebral vasculitis is a very rare condition that is difficult to diagnose, and as a result there are significant variations in the way it is diagnosed and treated.

Specific Diseases

Giant cell arteritis (GCA)
(Also known as temporal arteritis)

Symptoms
 Fever
 general uneasiness
 weight loss
 inflammation of the muscles causing stiffness in the shoulders; neck; and/or upper arms
 persisting headache
 pain in the jaw or ear while eating
 double vision
 partial loss of vision or blind spots
 (on rare occasions) stroke.

Diagnostic criteria
Three or more of the following five criteria must be met:
 Age 50 years or more
 New developed headache
 Tenderness of the superficial temporal artery
 Elevated sedimentation rate, at least 50 mm/hour (blood test that reveals inflammatory activity)
 Giant cell arteritis in a biopsy specimen from the temporal artery

Takayasu's arteritis

Symptoms
Starts with nonspecific symptoms such as:
 Localized joint pain
 Fever
 Fatigue
 Headaches
 Rashes
 Weight loss
 Diagnosis usually does not happen until the blockage causes deficient blood flow to the extremities or to a stroke.

Classification criteria
Three or more of the following six criteria must be met:
 Age when disease starts is under 50
 Decreased brachial artery pulse
 Systolic blood pressure differs by more than 10mmHg between arms
 Cramping caused by exercise in the extremities
 Abnormal sounds (through stethoscope) over subclavian arteries or abdominal aorta
 A narrowing or blockage in the aorta, its primary branches, or large arteries as seen through a radiograph of the arteries.

Treatment therapy
 50% of patients respond to corticosteroid therapy alone in early phases
 Methotrexate or Azathioprine are an alternative to corticosteroid immunosuppressants
 There have been studies on Mycophenolate mofetil and anti-TNF therapies
 In Takayasu’s arteritis it is vital to combine drug treatments often with low-dose aspirin or statin

Polyarteritis nodosa (PAN)

Symptoms
 Systemic illness with fever
 General feeling of discomfort or uneasiness with cause difficult to identify
 Weight loss
 Arthritis
 Black discoloration of skin primarily on the extremities
 Severe inadequate blood supply to the extremities
 Ischemic stroke, hemorrhages and a progressive encephalopathy with or without seizures may occur

Diagnostic Criteria
Three or more of the following ten criteria are required:
 More than 4 kg (8.8 lb) weight loss
 Lace-like purplish discoloration of the skin (livedo reticularis)
 Testicular pain
 Pain in a muscle or group of muscles (myalgias)
 Damage to peripheral nerves
 Elevation of blood pressure by more than 90 mmHg
 Creatinine serum levels greater than 1,5 mg/dl
 Hepatitis B or C virus antibodies
 An aneurysm or occlusion as shown in a pathologic arteriography
 Histology findings typical of PAN

Treatment therapy
 In PAN not associated with a hepatitis virus: prednisone and cyclophosphamide therapy. In case of emergency, plasmapheresis may be tried
 In PAN associated with a hepatitis virus: combination therapy of prednisone along with a virustatic, such as lamivudine (Hepatitis B) or interferon-alpha and ribavirin (Hepatitis C)

Granulomatosis with polyangiitis (GPA)

Symptoms
 Men are affected twice as often as women
 Compression of structures surrounding the nose and paranasal sinuses
 Diabetes insipidus
 Abnormal protrusion of the eyeball(s)
 Nonseptic meningitis
 Affection of the lung and kidney due to destruction of the arteries and veins
 Ischemic stroke, hemorrhages, or encephalopathy with possible seizures

Diagnostic Criteria
Two or more of the following four criteria are required:
 Necrotizing ulcerating inflammation of nose, sinuses, mouth or pharynx
 Irregular lung infiltrates
 Nephritis
 Granulomatous vascular and perivascular inflammation

Treatment Therapy
 Corticosteroids (e.g., Prednisolone)
 Cyclophosphamide
 Azathioprine
 Mycophenolate mofetil

References

External links 

Cerebrovascular diseases
Inflammations
Rheumatology
Steroid-responsive inflammatory conditions